The Supreme Judicial Council of Iraq is the supreme administrative authority responsible for the affairs of the judiciary in Iraq.

Establishment
The Judicial Council comprises:

 President of the Court of Cassation and deputies
 Chairman of the State Consultative Council
 Chief Prosecutor
 Head of the Judicial Supervisory Board
 Presidents of the Courts of Appeal 
 Director General of the Administrative Department, whether judges or prosecutors. 
 President of the Federal Supreme Court
 Heads of federal courts of appeal
 President of the Court,  Kurdistan Region and its two deputies, 
 Head of the Public Prosecution 

This Council was established under Article 87 of the Constitution of the Republic of Iraq in force.

See also
 Law of Iraq

References

External links
 Official website(Supreme Judicial Council of Iraq)

Judiciary of Iraq
Politics of Iraq